Starye Kargaly (İśke Qarğalı) is a rural locality (a village) in Baltachevsky District, Bashkortostan, Russia. The population was 202 as of 2010. There are 6 streets.

Geography 
Staryye Kargaly is located 25 km southwest of Starobaltachevo (the district's administrative centre) by road. Tuchubayevo is the nearest rural locality.

References 

Rural localities in Baltachevsky District